Boravelli  is a village in Manopadu mandal of Jogulamba Gadwal district in the state of Telangana, India.

This village was formally an agricultural sector area. Every January people celebrate Jaatara. The village is a historic place in Jougulamba Gadwal district. It is the birthplace of Suravaram Pratap Reddy.

Population 
The population of this village was around 5000.

Languages 
Residents of Boravelli speak Telugu, Hindi and Urdu.

References

Villages in Jogulamba Gadwal district
Manopadu